The Longueuil Ducs are a junior baseball team that play in the Ligue de Baseball Élite du Québec. The Ducs play their home games at Parc Paul-Pratt in Longueuil, Quebec, Canada. Established in 1957 by former Montreal Canadiens star Émile Bouchard as the Longueuil Junior, the team was later renamed the Longueuil Marquis, before settling on its current name, the Longueuil Ducs. The Ducs are one of the oldest baseball clubs in the province of Quebec.

Former players
The following is a list of notable players who have played for the Ducs de Longueuil in the past:
Claude Gladu, former mayor of Longueuil
 Steve Green, Canada national baseball team and formerly for the Anaheim Angels, Philadelphia Phillies and Boston Red Sox
 Guillaume Leduc, Savannah Sand Gnats
 Leonardo Ochoa, Salem-Keizer Volcanoes
 Karl Gélinas, Capitales de Québec
 Ivan Naccarata, Capitales de Québec

References

External links
http://www.ducsdelongueuil.com

Baseball teams in Quebec
Sport in Longueuil
1957 establishments in Quebec
Baseball teams established in 1957